This was the first edition of the tournament.

Sander Gillé and Joran Vliegen won the title, defeating Marcelo Demoliner and Matwé Middelkoop in the final, 7–6(7–2), 7–6(7–4).

Seeds

Draw

Draw

References

External Links
 Main Draw

Zhuhai Championships - Doubles
2019 Doubles
2019 in Chinese sport